WOZI (101.9 FM, "The Rock") is a classic rock formatted broadcast radio station licensed to Presque Isle, Maine, United States, serving the Presque Isle/Caribou/Houlton area. WOZI is owned and operated by Townsquare Media.

References

Previous Logos

External links
101-9 The Rock Online

Classic rock radio stations in the United States
OZI
Radio stations established in 1981
Presque Isle, Maine
Townsquare Media radio stations